This page provides the comparison tables of functional programming instructions between programming languages. Comparison of basic instructions of imperative paradigm is provided by the comparison of basic instructions.

List operations

Function applications and lists 
For brevity, these words will have the specified meanings in the following tables (unless noted to be part of language syntax):

 A function. May be unary or n-ary (or always unary for languages without n-ary functions).
 Unary function returning a Boolean value..
 The list being operated on.
 A pattern, in languages with pattern matching.
 Any relevant value, depending on context.

Numerical operations on lists 
 a binary function that returns a value indicating sort order (an integer in most languages).

Iterations on lists

Generating lists by combinatorics tools 

start first value of range.
step increment of range.
count number of items in range.
last inclusive last value of range.
end exclusive last value of range.

References 

functional programming